Teen Titans is a video game released for the Game Boy Advance on October 16, 2005. The game is based on the television show Teen Titans and features the five main characters from the show as playable characters: Robin, Raven, Beast Boy, Starfire, and Cyborg. The game's boss characters are Gizmo, Jinx, Mammoth, and Brother Blood. The game was going to be released in Europe shortly after its release in North America, though the European release was later cancelled. A sequel, Teen Titans 2: The Brotherhood's Revenge, often shortened to simply Teen Titans 2, was released exclusively in North America for the Game Boy Advance on October 23, 2006.

Story
Tired of the Teen Titans defeating him, Brother Blood decides to make clones of them to do his bidding. The Teen Titans must hunt down his students and get their DNA back.

Reception

The game was met with mixed reception upon release; GameRankings gave it a score of 60.30%, while Metacritic gave it 61 out of 100.

Sequel

The sequel was met with mixed to negative reception, as GameRankings gave it a score of 62.50%, while Metacritic gave it 45 out of 100.

See also

Teen Titans (console game)

References

External links

2005 video games
Behaviour Interactive games
Game Boy Advance-only games
Game Boy Advance games
Majesco Entertainment games
North America-exclusive video games
Superhero video games
Teen Titans (TV series)
Video games based on animated television series
Video games based on DC Comics
Video games developed in Canada
Video games set in the United States